Next Magazine is a weekly gay lifestyle magazine that was published in New York City from July 1993 to September 2016. It addressed topics of fashion, life, entertainment, sex, and LGBT culture news, and was distributed freely in gay bars and other locations throughout Manhattan, Brooklyn, Queens, The Bronx, Long Island, and New Jersey.

History
The first issue of Next Magazine "hit the streets of New York" on July 23, 1993. It was founded by co-publishers David Moyal and nightlife promoter John Blair in response to the gay sexual revolution happening in and around the West Village and Chelsea neighborhoods of Manhattan. Their first offices were located at the corner of Fifth Avenue and 20th Street.

The need for an all-gay publication rose in the early 1990s when the LGBT community began having a political voice. Manhattan’s megaclubs were beginning to grow and gain notoriety, heavy drug use became commonplace in the gay community, and the AIDS epidemic was spreading rapidly. After the March on Washington and the election of Rudy Giuliani, the gay community (more specifically gay men) was in need of an open publication that catered to their needs.

Marketed as the first glossy-covered gay lifestyle publication to be carried on newsstands in the city, Next Magazine was first primarily popular for the escort listings and personal ad sections. The magazine was also the first to include a section that featured listings of upcoming gay meetings, events, and parties at legendary venues including The Roxy, The Tunnel, Limelight, and Club USA. The early covers of the magazine featured body shots of models. Most models did not begin showing their faces in gay publications until later years for fear of being outed.

In every issue, the magazine included a "Shot in the Dark" section, which featured pictures of local celebrities and entertainers such as Hedda Lettuce, John Blair, Michael Alig, Richie Rich, RuPaul and Amanda Lepore. "Shot in the Dark" has been the only feature from the original first copy that is still featured in the magazine today.

On July 1, 2009, Next Magazine became the only free local glossy gay night life publication in New York City, following the closure of longtime rival The New York Blade. The last issue of Next Magazine appeared in September 2016 when Multimedia Platforms, Inc. ceased operations. The parent company Multimedia Platforms laid off all its employees including those of Next Magazine.

See also
 LGBT culture in New York City

References

External links
 

LGBT-related magazines published in the United States
Lifestyle magazines published in the United States
Weekly magazines published in the United States
Defunct magazines published in the United States
LGBT history in New York City
Magazines established in 1993
Magazines disestablished in 2016
Magazines published in New York City
Free magazines